BC Juventus, also known as Uniclub Casino Juventus  for sponsorship reasons, is a Lithuanian professional basketball club based in Utena, Lithuania. Founded in 1999, the club currently plays in the Lithuanian Basketball League.

History

2000–2007: foundation and participation in RKL 
Juventus basketball club was founded in 1999 and debuted in Naujametinis Utenos rajono Mero taurės turnyras (Utena's new year's mayor's cup tournament) and took third place. First team roster consisted of other sports players: football players and one handball player. First team captain, which also founded Juventus basketball team was football player Nerijus Kuzmickas (played in Kauno Inkaras team), now Šiauliai football academy, child and teenage coach. In the debut Juventus season also played: Egidijus Varnas (FK Ekranas), Tomas Keraitis, Tomas Karvelis and others.

In 2003–2004 season, Juventus basketball team was coached by Rimvydas Vaitkus. Juventus debuted in Lithuania basketball B league and in their debut season, BC Juventus took sixth place.

After year, in 2004–2005 season, Juventus basketball team was coached by Mindaugas Kildišius. Juventus basketball team first time in the club history won LKBL championship (same like RKL) and won right to participate in the LKAL championship (same like NKL). But because of various bureaucracy barriers, Juventus basketball team wasn't permitted to debut in the second-tier Lithuania basketball league.

During 2005–2006 season, BC Juventus took third place in RKL tournament. One season later, Juventus won RKL championship once again and in transition match to the NKL championship, BC Juventus won against Kauno LKKA-Atletas basketball team. But this wasn't the end for Juventus in the 2006–2007 season as BC Juventus went until third Lithuania basketball federation (LKF) stage and only there, after two unremitting matches lost to Klaipėdos Neptūnas. Same year, team coach Mindaugas Kildišius, was named the best RKL championship coach.

2007–2009: NKL 

In 2007–2008 season Utena's basketball team debuted in the NKL championship and won regular season (25 wins and 7 losses), however in the final standings BC Juventus took only fourth place. In the end of 2007, Juventus guard Raimondas Ambrulaitis was named "Lithuania basketball discovery of the year", team coach Mindaugas Kildišius was named the best 2007–2008 NKL season coach.

One year later, Juventus basketball team won NKL regular season once again and participated in NKL championship semi-finals. In 2009, Juventus wasn't able to participate in the NKL finals, because of that team coach Mindaugas Kildišius retired from his position. Also because of that, Mindaugas Kildišius assistant Rolandas Urkis coached Juventus basketball team until the end of the season. On 15 June 2009 LKF decided to let Juventus basketball team participate in the Lithuania super basketball league LKL because of the commercial principles. For the permission to participate in the Lithuanian Basketball League (LKL), Juventus basketball team had to pay 350 thousand LTL.

2009–present: LKL 

On 20 August 2009 Gintaras Kručkauskas became main Juventus basketball team coach. The 2009–2010 Lithuanian Basketball League (LKL) season was the most successful in the club history as Juventus basketball team took fourth place in the LKL championship.

On 7 July 2010 Robertas Giedraitis became main BC Juventus coach.

During 2010–2011 season, BC Juventus first time in the club history became Baltic Basketball League Challenge Cup champions. Also BC "Juventus" made a huge surprise as they eliminated 7-time LKL Bronze streaker Šiauliai in the first round of LKL playoffs (first game: 105:94, second game: 91:81). After eliminating Šiauliai in quarter-final, BC Juventus reached LKL semi finals and met Lithuania basketball powerhouse Žalgiris. On 27 April 2011 BC Juventus lost first game at Kaunas Sports Hall against Žalgiris with result 63–95, the second match took place on 29 April 2011 in Utena. Juventus lost the second game too and had to fight for LKL Bronze against Rūdupis. Juventus lost first Bronze game at Prienai with result 65–79, the second game was unsuccessful for Juventus too as they lost it in their home arena in Utena with result 73–98. The third game took place in Prienai, which Juventus team lost with result 83–84, because of that they lost Bronze series 0–3 against Rūdupis and took fourth place in the LKL championship that season.

In the 2011–2012 and 2012–2013 seasons, Juventus did not accomplish anything notable. After the 2011–2012 season, where Juventus missed the playoffs entirely, Robertas Giedraitis was fired as head coach. After Rytis Vaišvila was hired as head coach, Juventus made the playoffs in 2013, and fought valiantly against Lietuvos rytas, though losing the series 0–2.

In the 2013–2014 season, Juventus replaced coach Vaišvila with former longtime Žalgiris player, coach and sports director Vitoldas Masalskis. Despite high hopes, the season started poorly, and coach Masalskis was replaced with Virginijus Sirvydis, former longtime player in the LKL. The move helped the team regroup and reach the playoffs, but lost to TonyBet Prienai 0:2. The team also played in the BBL Elite division, but didn't make the playoff stage for two straight seasons.

In 2014–15 LKL season the club reached new highs. Before the season, the well-known Rashaun Broadus was signed, and quickly became the leader of the team. The team took 5th place during the regular LKL season and in the quarterfinals they met the 4th seed Pieno žvaigždės. After the impressive series, Juventus overcome Pieno žvaigždės 3–2 and qualified into the LKL semifinals for the third time in club's history. Despite having a regular season victory over BC Žalgiris, Juventus was no match for BC Žalgiris in the semifinals, losing the series 0:3. Though, Juventus shockingly defeated EuroLeague participant Neptūnas 3:2 and won LKL bronze medals for the first time in club's history. Rashaun Broadus led the team with 25 points and 10 assists in the crucial game. His comment following the game was: "We don't care what anybody thinks about us. We played hard every game. Everybody told us that we will be down 3–0 and now we won medals". Juventus also finished 4th in the LKF Cup, as well as winning the bronze medals in the BBL, capping off the most successful season in club history.

In 2015–2016 season Utenos Juventus was invited compete in EuroCup for the first time in the club history as LKL bronze medalists. Though, they decided to choose the FIBA Europe Cup version instead. By preparing for their debut in the first-ever European competition, BC Juventus signed with former Lithuania men's national basketball team head coach Antanas Sireika to replace the LKL bronze medals winning Dainius Adomaitis, who signed with Neptūnas Klaipėda. Juventus qualified into the second stage of the FIBA Europe Cup by being the second-best team among teams which took third place in their groups. After successfully playing at the Round of 32 where they took first place in the group, Juventus advanced into the playoffs but there they were immediately eliminated by the Croatian powerhouse Cibona Zagreb after two close games (78–83, 84–87). In the LKL playoffs, Juventus defeated Vytautas in the quarterfinals 3–2, but lost to Žalgiris in the semifinal sweep 0–3. In the bronze medal game, Juventus lost to BC Lietuvos rytas 0–3.

In 2016–2017 season Juventus qualified into the Basketball Champions League after crushing FC Porto 77–59 on 29 September 2016. In the Champions League group stage, Juventus qualified to the playoffs, finishing 4th in the group with an 8–6 record. In the playoffs, Juventus faced the legendary AEK team, and were eliminated, losing both at home 77:78, and away 54:75. In February, Juventus also delivered the biggest shock in the King Mindaugas Cup tournament, eliminating champion BC Lietuvos rytas 87:84 in the quarterfinals. In the tournament semifinals, Juventus lost a hard-fought game to another favorite, Lietkabelis, 70:75, but won the 3-rd place game against rival Vytautas 70:61. In the LKL playoffs, Juventus faced Neptūnas in the quarterfinals - they were no match for Neptūnas, who swept the series 3:0 in dominating fashion, with a 19-point average.

Before the 2017–2018 season, team star and LKL MVP Jamar Diggs left to play in France and coach Sireika returned to BC Šiauliai. Juventus signed strong players like Anthony Ireland, LaRon Dendy, Jonte Flowers and the stars of the 2015 season in which Juventus won 3rd place, Arvydas Šikšnius and Simas Buterlevičius. Coach Gediminas Petrauskas was signed to replace Sireika. Juventus qualified for the Basketball Champions League by defeating PBC Academic 82:81 and 86:79. After this, Juventus had a horrible streak - after starting 0–7 in the LKL, coach Petrauskas resigned, and longtime player, assistant coach and team president Žydrūnas Urbonas took over as head coach. The team greatly improved, both in the LKL, and the Champions League. In the King Mindaugas Cup quarterfinals, Juventus faced BC Lietuvos rytas in a previous season rematch, losing in overtime 88:91, after some questionable calls by the referees at the end of game. In the Champions League, Juventus finished the regular season with a 4–10 record, but a win against UCAM Murcia 70:56 in the last game of the regular season helped the team qualify for the 2017–18 FIBA Europe Cup playoffs. Juventus defeated Alba Fehérvár on aggregate 163:152 (87:74 at home and 76:78 away) in the Round of 16, qualifying for the quarterfinals. Juventus lost to Sidigas Avellino in the quarterfinals, on aggregate 145:162 (77:77 at home and 68:85 away). Jonte Flowers was replaced by Dino Pita during the season. By the end of the season, injuries, disciplinary issues and release of one of the teams leaders LaRon Dendy caused the team to go on a 5-game losing streak in the LKL, plummeting in the standings and finishing only in 7th place. Juventus faced Lietuvos rytas in the playoffs, losing the series 0:3, though came very close to winning the second game in Utena, losing in the final seconds after erasing an 18-point deficit.

In the 2018–2019 season, Juventus didn't play in European competitions, because of money troubles from the previous season. Team leaders Ireland and Kupšas left the team, being replaced by Alex Hamilton and the returning Vaidas Čepukaitis. Dovis Bičkauskis, Kenny Gaines and Šikšnius remained with the team, while Urbonas remained as head coach. Martinas Geben, who Juventus loaned from BC Žalgiris, became the first player from Juventus to get an invitation for the Lithuania men's national basketball team, playing in the World Cup qualification. After a 2–5 start, Juventus also signed Marius Runkauskas and Tomas Dimša to strengthen the team. Hamilton, the team leader, left in December. Juventus recovered, and in February, the heavily improved Bičkauskis became the second player from Juventus to get an invitation to the national team. In the King Mindaugas Cup, Juventus eliminated the NKL champions BC Neptūnas-Akvaservis and BC Nevėžis in the first two rounds, before facing BC Rytas for the third straight season in the quarterfinals – this time, in a two-game series decided on aggregate. Juventus lost the controversial first match in Vilnius, 85–87, after questionable calls in the final minutes, including the ejection of head coach Urbonas. In the rematch, Juventus started poorly, but recovered and led for most of the game – before Urbonas received a technical foul with minutes left, and Rytas, led by Seeley and Bendžius, took control and won the game, 76–65, winning the series on aggregate, 163:150, and eliminating Juventus from the competition. Juventus finished with a 15–21 record in the LKL, in 6th place. Geben was named the MVP of the LKL for the regular season. Juventus faced Rytas in the LKL quarterfinals, and nearly created one of the biggest upsets in LKL history – in the first game, in Vilnius, Juventus lost, 91–93, after a last-second three-pointer by Gerben missed. In the second game, Juventus finally beat Rytas, 92–83, to tie the series at 1–1, giving Rytas their first ever loss in the quarterfinals. In the decisive game, Juventus lost, 63–84, losing the series, 1–2, but earning praise for their amazing efforts.

Celebrating their 20th anniversary, BC Juventus announced a new club logo for the upcoming 2019–20 season. The biggest losses during the summer where Martinas Geben returning to Žalgiris, Bičkauskis leaving to sign with Rytas, and Tomas Dimša leaving to sign with BC Lietkabelis. Juventus signed Julius Jucikas, Bryant Crawford, Shannon Scott, Žygimantas Skučas and the returning former LKL MVP Vytautas Šulskis to strengthen the team. During the season, Juventus continued their war with Rytas Vilnius, once again facing Rytas in the King Mindaugas Cup - after winning their first match at home 85:81, Juventus lost a controversial rematch 94:103 in Vilnius, with Rytas advancing to the semifinals. In the LKL, Juventus was fighting for the 4th place in the standings against BC Neptūnas, with the strength of the new signings to the club and the improved Gytis Radzevičius, playing the best season of his career. Due to the coronavirus outbreak, the season ended early, and Juventus, one win behind Neptūnas, finished the season in 5th place. Juventus also played in the Lithuanian 3x3 championship during the summer, winning the tournament.

Juventus quickly became one of the better teams of the LKL of the 2020–2021 season. Under coach Urbonas, and led by their 3x3 championship, in particular Skučas, winning team, Crawford, the returning Mindaugas Kupšas and former Rytas player Martynas Gecevičius, and late season signing Vaidas Kariniauskas, Juventus shocked everyone by destroying Rytas in the King Mindaugas Cup, winning both at home 89:87 and away 105:78, getting sweet revenge from the previous season's controversial losses. Juventus, having lost in the semifinals to Lietkabelis, won the KMT bronze medals by defeating BC Neptūnas. Juventus also participated in FIBA 3x3 tournaments during the season, having much success and becoming one of the best teams in the world. In the LKL, Juventus managed to reach the LKL semifinals with a win over CBet Prienai 2–0 in the quarterfinals. Juventus lost 0–3 to BC Žalgiris in the semifinals. Facing Eurocup team BC Lietkabelis in the bronze medal series, Juventus took the series to the limit, but lost the deciding game 63:84 in Panevėžys, and lost the series 2–3. Juventus finished the LKL season 4th.

Success in the 2021–2022 season resulted in Juventus earning a bid in the 2021–22 Basketball Champions League qualification. While Juventus lost Kariniauskas and Skučas during the off-season, much of the previous season team remained. Juventus signed Tomas Lekūnas to replace Skučas. At point guard, Juventus signed Patrick Miller to replace Kariniauskas at point guard. Juventus also signed Rokas Gustys and Norbertas Giga to strengthen the team. In the Basketball Champions League qualification, Juventus managed to reach the final stage, by beating the Kapfenberg Bulls 90:68 in the quarterfinals, and multiple time German champions and past EuroLeague participant Brose Bamberg 83:79 in the semifinals, thanks to strong play from Miller. In the finals, Juventus lost to Kalev/Cramo 81:86 in the finals, not qualifying for the Basketball Champions League regular season. In the LKL, Juventus started strong, thanks to strong play from Miller, fighting for the third spot in the standings, including a memorable 111:89 win over BC Rytas in Vilnius. By the start of 2022, Juventus started struggling. Adreian Payne, the heavily hyped signing at center to replace the departed Kupšas, arrived not ready to play, had multiple conflicts with coach Urbonas and left the team in February. It would turn out to be his final team. The team started falling apart - injuries, losses in the LKL, a shock exit against BC Šiauliai in the King Mindaugas Cup quarterfinals, even some fan protests, resulted in head coach Žydrūnas Urbonas resigning in April. Juventus, left with the assistants at the helm, finished the LKL regular season in 6th place. In the LKL quarterfinals, Juventus faced, and lost, to BC Lietkabelis 0:3, though not before giving the best fight they can against the team that made the Eurocup playoffs, and later managed to qualify to the LKL finals.

Players

Retired numbers

Current roster

Depth chart

Squad changes for/during 2021-22 season

In

|}

Out

|}

Honours

Domestic competitions
LKBL
Winners (1): 2005
RKL
Winners (1): 2007
Lithuanian Basketball League
3rd place (1): 2015
King Mindaugas Cup
3rd place (2): 2017, 2021

Regional competitions
BBL Challenge Cup
Winners (1): 2011

Season by season

Detailed information of former rosters and results.

Logos

Club name changes
 1999–2004: Utenos Juventus
 2004–2009: Utenos Juventus LKSK (LKSK means:)
 2009–present: Utenos Juventus

Head coaches
  Gintaras Kručkauskas: (2009–2010)
  Robertas Giedraitis: (2010–2012)
  Rytis Vaišvila: (2012–2013)
  Vitoldas Masalskis: (2013)
  Virginijus Sirvydis: (2013–2014)
  Dainius Adomaitis: (2014–2015)
  Antanas Sireika: (2015–2017)
  Gediminas Petrauskas: (2017)
  Žydrūnas Urbonas: (2017–2022)
  Nedas Pocevičius (interm) (2022)
  Donaldas Kairys: (2022–present)

Notable players
  Virginijus Praškevičius: (2009–2010)
  Aurimas Kieža: (2010–2011)
  Marius Prekevičius: (2010–2011)
  Žydrūnas Urbonas: (2009–2012)
  Ejike Ugboaja: (2013)
  Jeremy Hazell: (2013–2014)
  Rashaun Broadus: (2014–2015)
  Ovidijus Galdikas: (2016–2017)
  Dainius Šalenga: (2016–2017)
  Jamar Diggs: (2016–2017)
  Jamel Artis: (2020)
  Marius Runkauskas: (2018–2021)
  Patrick Miller (2021–2022)
  Adreian Payne (2021–2022)

Mascot
From 2012 BC Juventus has its own mascot, named Juvis. Juvis is a red color devil, wearing the blue color sneakers and mostly carries the golden fork. The golden fork form reminds horseshoe, symbolizing the Utena city coat of arms.

References

External links

 Official website of BC Juventus 
 Official BC Juventus Facebook group 
 BC Juventus YouTube channel
 BC Juventus at LKL.lt 
 BC Juventus at LKL.lt  (archive)
 BC Juventus at BBL.lt (archive)

BC Juventus
Juventus
Sport in Utena
Basketball teams established in 1999
1999 establishments in Lithuania